Macedonian Thrace Brewery is a Greek brewery, founded in 1996, based in Komotini and  Vergina Beer is its signature product. It also has branches in Athens and Thessaloniki.

History 

A Greek American chemical engineer, Demetri Politopoulos, with a Diploma in Brewing Technology from Siebel Institute of Technology in Chicago, and his brother during a trip to North Mexico, searching for investment opportunities, showed enthusiasm over the variety and the number of beer brands of the country. After returning to their hometown, Manhattan, while they were having a conversation about beers they started wondering which beers were drinking while back in Greece. Soon, Demetri figured out none of the beer trademarks in Greece were actually having Greek interests and almost in every country a significant rate of the inland consumption of beer was fulfilled by local breweries.

Macedonian Thrace Brewery S.A. was founded on February 1, 1996 and the Industrial area of Komotini was selected as the seat of the company facilities due to its infrastructures, the well organised business environment and its motives. The main goal of the newly founded company was the production of the "first Greek beer" under the trade name "Vergina"(). Thus, the construction of the brewery began and lasted until the fall of 1997. After some problems at the production, Vergina Beer finally managed to release on February 18, 1998. Some of the difficulties occurred caused by the unfair competition tactics for which Athenian Brewery, a Heineken subsidiary company, later was found guilty by the court, but had already affected the growth of the company. Nowadays, The market share of the company ranges between around 5 and 7 percent.

The company introduced first the concept of contract farming to Greece in 2006 and as of 2019 the contracted acreage exceeded the 35,000 acres in Macedonia and Thrace.

In 2013 Vergina Weiss won the Silver Medal and the second place for MTB in the "Speciality Wheat Beer" category at the International Brewing Awards competition, the oldest one since 1886. In 2014 and 2018 again Vergina Weiss won the Bronze and Silver Medal accordingly, in the "South German-Style Hefeweizen Hell" category at the European Beer Star competition. In 2020 the company launched a new beer product, Vergina Alcohol Free, a low-alcohol beer (almost zero), and proceeded to a general rebranding with the formation of a new logo, graphics and products packaging.

Products 

The Brewery mainly produces Vergina Premium Lager, Vergina Red, Vergina Weiss, Vergina Porfyra Vergina XXX Black and Vergina Alcohol Free, but is also the producer for Edelsteiner, Hillas and Prost beer trademarks.

Vergina beer products are exported since 1999 in US, England, Italy, Australia, Japan, Netherlands, Turkey, Bulgaria, Cyprus and more.

Former packaging and branding.

References List 

Breweries in Greece
Beer in Greece
Greek brands
Komotini
Greek companies established in 1996
Food and drink companies established in 1996